Perm or PERM may refer to:

Places
Perm, Russia, a city in Russia
Permsky District, the district
Perm Krai, a federal subject of Russia since 2005
Perm Oblast, a former federal subject of Russia 1938–2005
Perm Governorate, an administrative unit until 1923
Great Perm, a medieval state
Perm, Ontario, a small community in Canada

Other uses
 Perm (hairstyle), or permanent hairstyle, that may last for several months
 Perm (unit), a unit of permeance (or water vapor transmission) of materials and membranes
 PERM (computer), an early electronic computer
 PERM (labor certification) (Program Electronic Review Management), an American electronic labor certification system
 P.E.R.M. or Petrol Electric railmotor
 "Perm", a 2016 song by Bruno Mars from 24K Magic
 Permian, a geologic period

See also
Permian (disambiguation)
Permsky (disambiguation)
Permutation (mathematics)
UEC-Perm Engines, a Russian company